In medicine, the Golden S sign is a sign seen on imaging of the chest that suggests a central lung mass or lung collapse. It was first described by Dr. Ross Golden (1889-1975) in 1925 in association with bronchial carcinoma, but it is also seen in metastatic cancer, enlarged lymph nodes, and collapse of the right upper lobe of the lung. 

Dr. Golden became the first professor of radiology when he joined Columbia Presbyterian Medical Center in 1922.  It was there that he became the first chairman of the Department of Radiology until his retirement in 1954.  He then became the visiting professor of radiology at UCLA Medical, 1954–1975.  Dr. Golden is considered a pioneer in the field of Diagnostic Radiology when it was in its infancy, and was the author of many books, journals and periodicals on the subject. He was (twice) president of the Roentgen Ray Society as well as a trustee of the New York Academy of Medicine, and chairman of Radiological Services for the American Medical Association. Among his many honors and accolades, he was honored by President Nehru of India in 1956 for his assistance in improving radiological services throughout that country.

Appearance
The Golden S sign can be seen on plain radiographs as well as on computed tomography (CT) scans of the chest. The sign is seen in the right lung as a distorted minor fissure, whose lateral aspect is concave inferiorly and whose medial aspect is convex inferiorly. This produces a "reverse S" appearance, responsible for the sign being occasionally called the reverse S sign of Golden.

References

Radiologic signs